CSX may refer to:

 CSX Transportation, a United States railroad company
 CSX Corporation, the above railroad system's parent company
 IATA code for Changsha Huanghua International Airport
 Cambodia Securities Exchange
 Shelby CSX, a limited-production performance automobile based on the Dodge Shadow
 Acura CSX, an entry-level luxury car from Acura, designed and sold in Canada
 Centre-left coalition, an alliance of political parties in Italy